VGU may refer to:

 Virtual Global University, a virtual university offering online distance education or virtual education
 Vietnamese-German University, a Vietnamese public university from Ho Chi Minh City, Vietnam
 Video Games Uncovered, is a UK based online video game publication.